Renaudarctus is a genus of tardigrades in the family Renaudarctidae. The genus was first described by Reinhardt Kristensen and Robert P. Higgins in 1984, and named after biologist Jeanne Renaud-Mornant.

Species
The genus includes two species:
 Renaudarctus fossorius Hansen, Kristensen & Jørgensen, 2012
 Renaudarctus psammocryptus Kristensen & Higgins, 1984 - type species

References

Further reading
Kristensen & Higgins, 1984 : A new family of Arthrotardigrada (Tardigrada: Heterotardigrada) from the Atlantic coast of Florida, U.S.A. Transactions of the American Microscopical Society, vol. 103, no. 3, p. 295-311.
 Nomenclator Zoologicus info

Tardigrade genera
Arthrotardigrada